Bernd Rützel (born 2 October 1968) is a German politician of the Social Democratic Party (SPD) who has been serving as a member of the Bundestag from the state of Bavaria since 2013.

Political career
Rützel first became a member of the Bundestag in the 2013 German federal election, representing the Main-Spessart district. 

In parliament, Rützel has since been serving on the Committee for Labour and Social Affairs. On the committee, he was his parliamentary group’s rapporteur on the 2021 Supply Chain Act. He became the committee’s chair in 2022. From 2018 to 2021, he also served on the Committee for Tourism.

In addition to his committee assignments, Rützel has been chairing the German-Canadian Parliamentary Friendship Group since 2020.

Within his parliamentary group, Rützel belongs to the Parliamentary Left, a left-wing movement.

References

External links 

  
 Bundestag biography 

1968 births
Living people
Members of the Bundestag for Bavaria
Members of the Bundestag 2021–2025
Members of the Bundestag 2017–2021
Members of the Bundestag 2013–2017
Members of the Bundestag for the Social Democratic Party of Germany
People from Main-Spessart